The IKF World Korfball Championship is an international korfball competition contested by the national teams of the members of International Korfball Federation (IKF), the sport's global governing body. The championship has been awarded roughly every four years since the inaugural tournament in 1978. The current champions are the Netherlands, who won the 2019 IKF World Korfball Championship.

The current format of the tournament involves 20 teams competing for the title at venues within the host nation over a period of about a week. The 11 World Championships have been won by two different national teams. The Netherlands have won all but one time, losing only to Belgium in the 1991 Korfball World Championship.

Results

a.e.t.: after extra time

Titles by team
 : 10
 : 1

Teams reaching the top four

* = hosts
^ = includes results representing West Germany between 1978 and 1987
# = includes results representing Great Britain between 1978 and 2003

Appearances

Debut of teams
Each successive World Championship has had at least one team appearing for the first time.

Note: The IKF considers Germany a successor to West Germany. Likewise, Catalonia is seen as a successor to Spain.

Comprehensive team results by tournament
Legend
 — Champions
 — Runners-up
 — Third place
 — Fourth place
 — Did not qualify
 — Did not enter / Withdrew
 — Hosts

For each tournament, the number of teams in each finals tournament (in brackets) are shown.

See also
 Korfball

External links
 IKF official site
 History of the IKF and the IKF World Championship

 
World championships
Korfball competitions
Recurring sporting events established in 1978